Rue de Harlay  is a street on the Île de la Cité in the 1st arrondissement of Paris, France.

Location
The street borders the Palais de Justice to the west and Place Dauphine to the east.

Name
The street was named after Achille de Harlay (1536–1616), président à mortier and later the first speaker of the Paris Parlement.

History
An 8.75-meter-wide street was traced around 1607 on land plots granted to Achille de Harlay. The street ran along the wall of the bailiwick hall gardens, the Jardins du roi.

In 1702, the street had 36 houses and 7 street lanterns. It was part of the Cité quarter.

An extension project of the Palais de Justice, declared of public interest by an order dated 26 May 1840, aimed to demolish the houses located at odd numbers in order to clear the view on the new buildings. But the Paris Police Prefecture, then located at Cour Harlay, occupied the empty houses after their owners were expropriated. The houses were actually destroyed in 1871–72 to enable the completion of the grand outside steps by Joseph-Louis Duc. The even-number houses that delimited Place Dauphine were demolished in 1874 to clear the view on the new Palais.

The building at No. 2, Rue de Harlay, is listed as a historic monument. It is the only remaining 17th-century building of the street.

The street was also called Harlay-au-Palais to distinguish it from Harlay-au-Marais in the 3rd arrondissement. The latter was re-named  in 1879.

Notable buildings

See also
List of streets in the 1st arrondissement of Paris

References

Streets in the 1st arrondissement of Paris
Île de la Cité